Le Pont-Chrétien-Chabenet is a commune in the Indre department in central France.

Geography
The Bouzanne flows west through the northern part of the commune, then flows into the Creuse, which forms the commune's southwestern border.

Population

Sights
The oldest wooden covered bridge in France is in the commune.

See also
Communes of the Indre department

References

Communes of Indre